Karl Borris (3 January 1916 – 18 August 1981) was a World War II Luftwaffe military aviator and test pilot. As a flying ace, he is credited with 43 victories, all of them over the Western Front, for which he was awarded the Knight's Cross of the Iron Cross, the highest award in the military and paramilitary forces of Nazi Germany during World War II. Borris was involved in the introduction of the Focke-Wulf Fw 190 to front line service. Borris and 30 other pilots, technicians and engineers extensively tested the Fw 190 and their input was used in the decision to continue the project.

World War II
World War II in Europe began on Friday 1 September 1939 when German forces invaded Poland. On 1 December 1939, Leutnant Borris joined Jagdgeschwader 26 "Schlageter" (JG 26—26th Fighter Wing), which had been named after Albert Leo Schlageter on 1 May 1939. There, he was assigned to II. Gruppe (2nd group). At the time, the Geschwader was commanded by Oberst Eduard Ritter von Schleich and II. Gruppe was led by Hauptmann Herwig Knüppel. The Gruppe was based at Werl and patrolled western German border during the "Phoney War" without having contact with the enemy. On 27 January, II. Gruppe was ordered to Dortmund where it stayed until 9 May 1940.

During the Battle of France on 13 May, Borris was shot down in his Messerschmitt Bf 109 E-3 by a Boulton Paul Defiant fighter near Dordrecht. He managed to bail out, was injured and returned to his Staffel on 17 May. According to Mathews and Foremann, his victor was either Flight Lieutenant Ken Gillies from No. 66 Squadron or Pilot Officer P.E.J. Greenhous from No. 264 Squadron. Prior to this mission, Borris had attended a gas-protection course in Berlin. Command of II. Gruppe changed frequently in 1940. On 19 May, Knüppel was killed in action, he was temporarily replaced by Hauptmann Karl Ebbinghausen until he was appointed Staffelkapitän (squadron leader) of 4. Staffel on 31 May. On 1 June, command of II. Gruppe was officially handed over to Hauptmann Erich Noack. Noack was killed in a landing accident on 24 July, and command of II. Gruppe was again given to Ebbighausen, who was then killed in action on 16 August. Hauptmann Erich Bode then led the Gruppe until 3 October when Hauptmann Walter Adolph was given command.

Boris claimed his first aerial victory on 1 June during the Battle of Dunkirk. He was credited with the destruction of a Royal Air Force (RAF) Supermarine Spitfire at 12:42 over the combat area of Dunkirk. The next day, II. Gruppe again fought over the Dunkirk battle zone and Borris claimed his second aerial victory. At 09:10, he claimed a Spitfire which came from either No. 66, No. 266 or No. 611 Squadron.

During the Battle of Britain, Borris was credited with two aerial victories on 13 August, a day that was codenamed Adlertag (Eagle Day) by the Luftwaffe. II. Gruppe made contact with Hawker Hurricane fighters from No. 56 Squadron over Maidstone and for the loss of one Bf 109 E-1 shot down, claimed two Hurricanes destroyed, both of them by Borris between Maidstone and Detling. On 6 September, he claimed another Hurricane shot down. This Hurricane was a No. 501 Squadron aircraft ans was claimed at 09:55 near Folkestone. Borris claimed his final aerial victory of the Battle of Britain on 25 October. On an escort mission for fighter bombers from II. Gruppe of Lehrgeschwader 2 (LG 2—2nd Demonstration Wing), Borris claimed the destruction of a No. 603 Squadron Spitfire near Maidstone.

Testing the Fw 190

On 5 March 1941, Borris, at the time the technical officer of II. Gruppe, and Oberleutnant Otto Behrens, the Staffelkapitän of 6. Staffel, were sent to the Luftwaffe main testing ground for new aircraft designs at Rechlin for operational testing of the then new Focke Wulf Fw 190. Both Borris and Behrens were prewar aircraft mechanics and headed a team of 30 mechanics and engineers. The unit was given six pre-production Fw 190 A-0 fighters for evaluation and conducted numerous test flights and made various suggestions which proved vital to working out all the technical challenges associated with a new aircraft design.

The Erprobungsstaffel 190, the operational Fw 190 test squadron, headed by Behrens, was ordered from Rechlin to the Le Bourget airfield near Paris on 1 August. There, they were tasked with training II. Gruppe of JG 26 on the Fw 190 A-1. Borris was transferred to the 6. Staffel which at the time was commanded by Oberleutnant Walter Schneider and was based at an airfield in Moorsele Belgium. 6. Staffel was the first operational unit to be equipped with the Fw 190. By September, the entire II. Gruppe was flying the Fw 190. On 9 August, he claimed his first aerial victory on the Fw 190. That day, the RAF had sent a "Rodeo" to Neufchâtel-Hardelot and Borris claimed a No. 403 Squadron Spitfire shot down near Campagne. On 20 September, the RAF Fighter Command flew three "Circuses" simultaneously; No. 100A targeted the Hazebrouck motor yards, No. 100B the Abbeville motor yards, and No. 100C hit the Rouen shipyards. In defense of this attack, Borris was credited with destruction of Spitfire, claimed at 16:57 near Mardyck. The next day, "Circus" No. 101 consisting of twelve Bristol Blenheim bombers and escorted by fourteen squadrons of Spitfires and Hurricanes targeted Béthune and Gosnay. In combat over Étaples, Borris managed to shoot down a No. 315 Polish Fighter Squadron Spitfire at 16:30.

Squadron leader
On 6 November 1941, Hauptmann Johann Schmid, the Staffelkapitän of 8. Staffel, was killed in action. In consequence, Borris was transferred and chosen as his successor. 8. Staffel was a squadron of III. Gruppe and at the time commanded by Major Gerhard Schöpfel. Borris claimed his first aerial victory whilst flying with 8. Staffel on 13 March 1942. By this date, his Fw 190 had been equipped with the FuG 25a Erstling, an identification friend or foe transponder, allowing German radar operators to distinguish between friendly and enemy aircraft. That day, the RAF sent "Circus" No. 114 to bomb the railway yards at Hazebrouck. III. Gruppe was dispatched and fought a lengthy air battle with the Kenley Wing. During this air battle, Borris downed a No. 602 Squadron Spitfire for his tenth aerial victory.

During the Dieppe Raid on 19 August 1942, on III. Gruppes second patrol of the day, a flight led by Borris and Oberleutnant Klaus Mietusch took off from Wevelgem airfield at 09:36. The flight intercepted Spitfire fighters from No. 19 and No. 121 Squadron, an Eagle Squadron. In this encounter, Borris claimed a Spitfire shot down at 10:15 in the vicinity of Dieppe. Following this 21st aerial victory claim, he was awarded the German Cross in Gold on 8 September.

Defense of the Reich
On 14 May 1943, the United States Army Air Forces (USAAF) targeted four separate targets in Germany, Belgium and the Netherlands. In defense of this attack, Borris was shot down in his Fw 190 A-5 (Werknummer 7326—factory number) by the defensive gunfire of a Boeing B-17 Flying Fortress bomber in combat near Wevelgem. He managed to bail out at  but opened his parachute too soon, causing it to partially collapse. He sustained multiple broken bones, requiring a lengthy period in hospitals and convalescence. On 22 June, Major Fritz Losigkeit the commander of I. Gruppe was transferred. In consequence, Oberst Josef Priller, the Geschwaderkommodore (wing commander) of JG 26, was forced to appoint a new Gruppenkommandeur (group commander). While Borris was still in a hospital, Priller called him and gave him command of I. Gruppe.

24 July marked the beginning of a period in the Combined Bomber Offensive which was referred to as "Blitz Week". As part of the offensive, the next day, U.S. Martin B-26 Marauder bombers attacked the Ghent coke furnaces. I. Gruppe, led by Borris, was scrambled at Woensdrecht to intercept the attack on Ghent. The Gruppe engaged the escorting fighters and claimed four Spitfires destroyed plus a further Spitfire damaged, without loss. Following this aerial battle, Borris was credited with two aerial victories over two No. 165 Squadron Spitfires claimed shot down north of Ghent at 15:04 and 15:09 respectively. The USAAF targeted the German aircraft industry on 17 August 1943 in the Schweinfurt–Regensburg mission. In defense of this attack, Borris, who had returned to his unit, claimed the first of 60 B-17 bombers lost by the USAAF that day.

On 17 September 1944, Allied forces launched Operation Market Garden, the operation to secure a bridgehead over the River Rhine. As part of this operation, the Allies flew resupplies to the combat area around Arnhem on 23 September. The transport aircraft were protected by 519 fighters from the VIII Fighter Command and 40 Lockheed P-38 Lightning fighters from the Ninth Air Force. German fighters dispatched by Luftflotte Reich never reached the transports. Borris led I. Gruppe to the Goch-Wesel area where he shot down a North American P-51 Mustang fighter from the 339th Fighter Group.

Operation Bodenplatte and defeat

On 24 November 1944, Priller with his Geschwaderstab of JG 26 and Borris with his I. Gruppe moved to an airfield near Handrup and Fürstenau. The next day, two pilots of JG 26 were awarded the Knight's Cross of the Iron Cross, Borris for 41 aerial victories, and Leutnant Heinz-Gerhard Vogt from 5. Staffel for 46 aerial victories. The presentation of the Knight's Cross was made by Oberst Hannes Trautloft, at the time Inspekteur der Tagjäger (Inspector of Day Fighters), at Fürstenau airfield on 5 December. Following the presentation, Borris led a flight of five Fw 190s against a formation of B-17s bombing Berlin and managed to shoot down a straggler from the 452d Bombardment Group west of Lingen. At Fürstenau airfield, the Gruppe was equipped with the Fw 190 D-9 aircraft and flew twelve combat missions in support of the Ardennes Counteroffensive, also known as the Battle of the Bulge. In these missions, Borris lost eight pilots killed in action, five were wounded and further four pilots were taken prisoner of war (POW).

On 31 December, 20 Fw 190 aircraft from III. Gruppe of Jagdgeschwader 54 (JG 54—54th Fighter Wing) under the command of Oberleutnant Hans Dortenmann arrived at Fürstenau in preparation for Operation Bodenplatte. Bodenplatte was an attempt at gaining air superiority during the stagnant stage of the Battle of the Bulge. That evening, Borris briefs the pilots of the mission, which is the Grimbergen Airfield. Led by Priller and Borris, 47 aircraft from the Geschwaderstab and I. Gruppe, and further 17 aircraft from III. Gruppe of JG 54 took off at 08:14 on 1 January 1945. The airfield at Gimbergen was almost completely abandoned, the damage inflicted was minimal, and the losses sustained where significant. III. Gruppe of JG 54 suffered five pilots killed or missing in action, plus four further taken prisoner of war, Borris lost six pilots either killed or missing in action, making the mission a total failure.

Borris claimed his 43rd and last aerial victory on 14 January and German forces were on the retreat in the Ardennes. At 15:25, Borris led a flight of 31 Fw 190 D-9s from Fürstenfeld, three Fw 190 had to abord the mission prematurely, on mission to protect the German jet bomber airfields in the vicinity of Rheine-Hopsten. Borris and his flight of 28 aircraft encountered Spitfires of the Second Tactical Air Force with the two Norwegian squadrons No. 331 and No. 332 Squadron. In this encounter, Borris claimed a Spitife shot down at 15:45 in the vicinity of Ibbenbüren.

Based at Flensburg Airfield, Borris surrendered I. Gruppe to British forces on 6 May 1945. He and his men were taken to a makeshift POW nearby.

Summary of career

Aerial victory claims
Mathews and Foreman, authors of Luftwaffe Aces: Biographies and Victory Claims, researched the German Federal Archives and found records for 43 aerial victory claims, all of which were claimed on the Western Front.

Victory claims were logged to a map-reference (PQ = Planquadrat), for example "PQ 05 Ost BE". These sectors were then subdivided into 36 smaller units to give a location area 3 × 4 km in size.

Awards
 Front Flying Clasp of the Luftwaffe
 Iron Cross (1939)
 2nd Class (7 September 1940)
 1st Class (5 September 1941)
 Honour Goblet of the Luftwaffe on 25 May 1942 as Oberleutnant and Staffelkapitän
 German Cross in Gold on 8 September 1942 as Oberleutnant in the 8./Jagdgeschwader 26
 Knight's Cross of the Iron Cross on 25 November 1944 as Major and Gruppenkommandeur of I./Jagdgeschwader 26 "Schlageter"

Notes

References

Citations

Bibliography

 
 
 
 
 
 
 
 
 
 
 
 
 
 
 
 
 
 
 
 
 
 
 
 

1916 births
1981 deaths
German prisoners of war in World War II held by the United Kingdom
German World War II flying aces
Luftwaffe pilots
People from the Province of Brandenburg
People from Teltow-Fläming
Recipients of the Gold German Cross
Recipients of the Knight's Cross of the Iron Cross
Military personnel from Brandenburg